This table displays the top-rated primetime television series of the 1953–54 season as measured by Nielsen Media Research.

References

1953 in American television
1954 in American television
1953-related lists
1954-related lists
Lists of American television series